Steamboat Creek is the name of several creeks in the U.S. state of Oregon:

Rivers of Oregon